Nera may refer to:

People
 Nera Smajic (born 1984), Bosnian-born Swedish footballer
 Nera Stipičević (born 1983), Croatian actress
 Nera White (1935–2016), American basketball player
 André António Ribeiro Novais (born 1988), Portuguese footballer known as Nera
 Nera Quinn Hardy (born 2015), Daughter of professional wrestler Jeff Hardy
 Nera Bošković, Great granddaughter of Roger Joseph Boscovich

Places
 Nera Plateau, Russian Far East
 Nera Gorge-Beușnița National Park, Romania

Rivers
 Néra River, a river of New Caledonia
 Nera (Danube), a tributary of the Danube, flowing through Romania and Serbia
 Nera (Tiber), a tributary of the Tiber in Italy
 Nera (Indigirka), a tributary of the Indigirka in Russia

Other uses
 Hesperocharis nera, a butterfly of the family Pieridae
 Naval Enlisted Reserve Association, a military advocacy group located in Falls Church, Virginia, USA
 NERA (armour), types of tank armour
 Nera (mythology), a character from Irish mythology
 Nera (company), a Norwegian manufacturer of high capacity wireless point-to-point and point-to-multipoint telecommunication products
NERA Economic Consulting, an American economic consultancy
 Quarter note, note value with black head

See also
 Ust-Nera
 Nero (disambiguation)
 New England Antiquities Research Association (NEARA)